LHS 292 is a red dwarf in the constellation Sextans. It is far too faint to be seen with the unaided eye and requires a large amateur telescope to be seen visually. It lies relatively close to the Solar System at a distance of about 14.9 light years. It is a flare star, which means it can suddenly increase in brightness for short periods of time.

It has the space velocity components  = .

See also
 List of nearest stars

References

Notes

External links
 ARICNS entry

Local Bubble
M-type main-sequence stars
Sextans (constellation)
Flare stars
3622